Pinkley is an extinct town in Reynolds County, in the U.S. state of Missouri.

A post office called Pinkley was established in 1920, and remained in operation until 1926. The community has the name of the local Pinkley family.

References

Ghost towns in Missouri
Former populated places in Reynolds County, Missouri